Viktor Solovyov (also Soloviev) may refer to the following Russian people:
Viktor Solovyov (actor) (born 1950), actor in The Scythian
Viktor Solovyov (sailor)  (born 1957), Russian keelboat sailor
Viktor Solovyov (swimmer) (born 1932), Russian backstroke swimmer